Dusa is an extinct genus of prawns, in the order Decapoda, containing five species.

See also
 Dusa (disambiguation)

References

Penaeidae
Prehistoric crustacean genera